Norman Musgrave Easton (1902-1966) was a South African architect, born on October 11, 1902 in Pretoria, who is best known for his design of banks and houses. He died in a car crash on July 19, 1966 in Pretoria.

After schooling in Pretoria and Cape Town, he enrolled in 1922 to earn a degree in architecture at the University of the Witwatersrand. There he met architect Gordon Leith, with whom he apprenticed from 1922 to 1930 while completing his studies. Leith hired Eaton as director of his Pretoria office in 1926. Eaton was awarded a nine-month residency at the British School at Rome in 1929 and then visited various European countries in 1930 and 1931.

He founded his own firm on his return to South Africa in 1933. He specialized in unpainted brick houses with African elements, including motifs reminiscent of Great Zimbabwe. Later designs also incorporated aspects of ancient Egyptian architecture as well. His houses emphasized regionalism through the use of local material and forms, including small windows, awnings, and eaves adapted to the warm climate; traditional wooden shutters; and large patches of earth-tone paved stone.

In 1940, he earned his first major commercial commission, the Land Bank in Potchefstroom. That same year, he entered a partnership with Alan Fair that continued until 1945. In 1945, he traveled to the United States, Argentina, and Brazil as well as parts of southern and central Africa. On his return, he was invited to restore the Reinet House in Graaff-Reinet. Among his best-known works are the Greenwood House, the Nedbank building on Church Street, Polley's Arcade, and the Little Theatre Unisa (all in Pretoria) as well as the Nedbank Building on Smith Street in Durban. His other designs for Landbank buildings include those in Potchefstroom, Pietermaritzburg, and Kroonstad.

Recognition and awards
In 1960, the Suid-Afrikaanse Akademie vir Wetenskap en Kuns awarded Eaton its Gold Medal. Several artists and architects, including Alexis Preller, expressed their praise of him at a memorial service a year and a half after his death. In 1968, the South African Institute of Architects posthumously awarded him their Gold Medal.

References

South African architects